Rakwana is a small town in the Ratnapura District, Sabaragamuwa Province of Sri Lanka, a notable centre of Ceylon tea plantations and industry. Additionally, Rakwana is said to have gem resources. Rakwana is locally administered by the Godakawela-Rakwana Urban Council. The town of Rakwana including its northern and southern part and Kottala has 10,513 in population according to the census carried out in 2010.

Located at an elevation of 464 m, north of Sinharaja Mountains, on the A17 highway.  It is 12 km from Madampe on the way to Galle. It also has roads leading to Kalawana and Godakawela. Rakwana acts as one of the gateways for the famous Sinharaja Forest reserve.

Demographics

The Population according to the Grama-Niladhari Division

Main Schools
 St.John's college, Rakwana  + 94 45 22 46 216
 St. Antony's School, Rakwana + 94 45 22 46 401
 Assalam School, Rakwana + 94 45 22 46 296
 Ratnaloka School, Rakwana  + 94 45 22 46 288

Post and telephone
 Sri Lanka + 94
 Area code 045
 Postal code 70300

Post and telephone 
 Rakwana Police Station  + 94 45 22 46 231
 Rakwana District Hospital  + 94 45 22 46 261
 Rakwana Post Office  + 94 45 22 46 252
 Rakwana People's Bank  + 94 45 22 46 270
 BOC Bank - Rakwana + 94 45 22 46 280
 Godakawela Pradeshiya Sabha Rakwana Sub office  + 94 45 22 46 275
 Rakwana Forest Office  + 94 45 22 46 297
 Godakawela Depot  + 94 45 22 40 381

Populated places in Sabaragamuwa Province